The Cider House Rules is a 1999 American drama film directed by Lasse Hallström from a screenplay by John Irving, based on Irving's 1985 novel of the same name. Its story follows Homer Wells, who lives in a World War II–era Maine orphanage run by a doctor who trained him, and his journey after leaving the orphanage. The film stars Tobey Maguire, Charlize Theron, Delroy Lindo, Paul Rudd, Michael Caine, Jane Alexander, Kathy Baker, Kieran Culkin, Heavy D, Kate Nelligan, and Erykah Badu.

The film was produced by Miramax Films and FilmColony and had its world premiere at the 56th Venice International Film Festival. It was given a limited release by Miramax Films in the United States on December 10, 1999, followed by a wide release on January 7, 2000. It grossed $110,098 in its opening weekend and $88.5 million worldwide, against a budget of $24 million. It was positively reviewed and has a 71% approval rating on Rotten Tomatoes.

The film won two Academy Awards: Irving won the Academy Award for Best Adapted Screenplay, while Michael Caine won his second Academy Award for Best Supporting Actor. It was nominated for the Academy Award for Best Picture, along with four other nominations at the 72nd Academy Awards. Irving documented his involvement in bringing the novel to the screen in his book, My Movie Business.

Plot
Homer Wells grows up in St.Cloud's, a Maine orphanage directed by avuncular Dr. Wilbur Larch. He is returned twice by foster parents: the first felt he was too quiet (due to orphanage babies soon learning crying is pointless) and the second beat him. Dr. Larch is addicted to ether and also secretly performs abortions. Conditions at the orphanage are sparse, but the children have love, are given respect, and are like an extended family. With older kids like Buster looking out for the younger ones and in particular care for those who are sickly like Fuzzy Stone who was born prematurely to an alcoholic mother suffering from bronchitis and as such spends most of his time beneath a plastic tent ventilated with a breathing apparatus. Each night before sleeping, Dr. Larch says to them, "Goodnight you Princes of Maine, you Kings of New England", as both an encouragement and a kind of blessing.

Homer, the oldest of the orphans, is very bright, helpful and even-tempered, so Larch trains him in obstetrics and abortions as an apprentice; despite Homer's never having attended high school. He disapproves of abortions, and, although he has been trained by Larch, he refuses to perform them. After several years, Homer is very skillful and confident in performing obstetrical duties. Larch wants him to take over after he retires, but Homer feels it's impossible, as he lacks formal medical education and he wants to see the outside world beyond the orphanage. Homer leaves with Candy Kendall and her boyfriend Wally Worthington, a young couple who came to the clinic for an abortion.  Wally is a pilot on leave from the service. Wally's mother, Olive, owns the Worthington family apple orchard where Homer settles as a worker. He lives on the Worthington estate in Cider House, the bunkhouse. Wally returns to World War II. Homer is exempt from this as Dr. Larch has diagnosed him with a heart condition.

While Wally is away, Candy starts flirting with Homer and they have an affair. He picks apples with Arthur Rose's team of migrant workers, employed seasonally at the orchard by the Worthingtons, and illiterate. Homer reads them the posted rules of the Cider House, the workers observe the rules have been made without the occupants' consent by people who do not live there and so do not face their problems.  Consequently, they feel that they can ignore them.  Homer and Candy become much closer during harvest and spend more time together while Wally is fighting in Burma. During this time while watching a private screening of King Kong Fuzzy Stone succumbs to his bronchitis with his death covered up by Larch, Buster and the other staff who falsely claim to all the orphans that Fuzzy was just adopted to keep up morale but their loss hits everyone hard none so more than Larch.

After Arthur and his team come back to work the following season, Homer discovers that Rose, Arthur's daughter, is pregnant. Candy finds out that the baby's father is Arthur. Homer decides he must help Rose, and performs an abortion with Arthur's assistance. A few days later, as Rose tries to run away, her father goes to say goodbye; she stabs him and flees. He then makes the injury worse, and as a last request, asks Homer and another worker to tell the police his death was a suicide.

Wally returns from Burma a paraplegic, and although she loves Homer, Candy decides to take care of Wally. Immediately after this, Homer learns Dr. Larch accidentally overdosed on ether. Homer decides he is most needed in the orphanage, where he is greeted joyously by both the children and staff. He learns not only did Larch fake his medical record to keep him out of the war, but also faked college credentials and also used reverse psychology to convince the orphanage board to appoint Homer as the next director. He fills the paternal role that Larch previously held for the children of the orphanage, telling them, "Goodnight you princes of Maine, you kings of New England".

Cast

Reception
On the review aggregator Rotten Tomatoes, the film holds a 71% approval rating, based on 112 reviews with an average rating of 6.6/10. The website's critical consensus reads, "The Cider House Rules derives affecting drama from wonderful performances, lovely visuals, and an old-fashioned feel." It also has a weighted average rating of 75 out of 100 on Metacritic, based on 32 critics, indicating "generally favorable reviews".

Leonard Maltin awarded the film a rare four-star rating. By contrast, Roger Ebert of the Chicago Sun-Times awarded it just two stars, stating the film: "is often absorbing or enchanting in its parts. Michael Caine's performance is one of his best, and Charlize Theron is sweet and direct as the girl", along with, "The story touches many themes, lingers with some of them, moves on and arrives at nowhere in particular."

Certificate
In the USA, the film was given a PG-13 certificate by the MPAA, and in the UK, it was given a 12 certificate by the BBFC, which meant that anyone aged 12 or over could see it. However, in Ireland, the film was given the strictest possible rating, 18. According to Ireland's Film Censor, Sheamus Smith, this was because of its themes of abortion, incest and drugs. At the time, Ireland had a constitutional ban on abortion, which would not be lifted until after a referendum in 2018.

Awards and nominations
The Cider House Rules won two Academy Awards and was nominated for an additional five:
 Best Actor in a Supporting Role: Michael Caine
 Academy Award for Best Adapted Screenplay: John Irving
 Nominated – Best Picture: Richard N. Gladstein
 Nominated – Best Director: Lasse Hallström
 Nominated – Best Art Direction: Art Direction: David Gropman; Set Decoration: Beth A. Rubino
 Nominated – Best Film Editing: Lisa Zeno Churgin
 Nominated – Best Original Score: Rachel Portman

See also
 Ventfort Hall Mansion and Gilded Age Museum

References

Further reading
 Tibbetts, John C., and James M. Welsh, eds. The Encyclopedia of Novels Into Film (2nd ed. 2005) pp 56–58.

External links

 
 
 
 

1999 films
1999 drama films
American drama films
Films about abortion
Films about orphans
Films based on American novels
Films based on works by John Irving
Films directed by Lasse Hallström
Films scored by Rachel Portman
Films featuring a Best Supporting Actor Academy Award-winning performance
Incest in film
Medical-themed films
Miramax films
Films set in orphanages
Films set in Maine
Films set in the 1920s
Films set in the 1940s
Films shot in Maine
Films whose writer won the Best Adapted Screenplay Academy Award
1990s English-language films
1990s American films